Kinney National Service, Inc. (later known as Kinney Services, Inc.) was an American conglomerate company from 1966 to 1972. Its successors were National Kinney Corporation and Warner Communications, Time Warner, AOL Time Warner, and WarnerMedia and its current successor is Warner Bros. Discovery. Kinney National's predecessors were Kinney Service Corporation and National Cleaning Contractors, Inc., whose merger began in January 1966 and was completed in August of the same year. National Cleaning Contractors had been founded in 1886 by Louis Frankel and Max Sweig as National Window Cleaning & House Renovating Co., and was later known as National House Cleaning Contractors, Inc.

History

Formation and expansion 
The company was formed on August 12, 1966, as Kinney National Service, Inc., when the Kinney Parking Company and the National Cleaning Contractors, Inc. were merged. The new company was headed by Steve Ross.

Kinney National Company (later, National was removed from the company title in February 1971) was known for purchases and sales:

 On July 21, 1967, Kinney National expanded by acquiring National Periodical Publications (more commonly, but not yet officially, called DC Comics, which would occur in 1977) which owned Mad (magazine) of E. C. Publications. The acquisition was completed on August 25 of the same year.
 On November 13, 1967, Kinney bought Hollywood talent agency Ashley-Famous. Ted Ashley (the founder of Ashley-Famous) suggested to Ross that he buy out the cash-strapped film company Warner Bros.-Seven Arts, which had purchased Atlantic Records that same month.
 In February 1968, Kinney acquired Panavision, Inc.  
 On October 8 of the same year, Kinney National sold its subsidiary Kinney System Rent-A-Car to Sandgate Corporation for about $11-million in cash and notes.
 On January 28, 1969, it was announced that Kinney National would acquire Warner Bros.-Seven Arts. The acquisition was completed on July 4. On April 20, Ashley-Famous was sold because of antitrust laws prohibiting a company from owning both a production studio and a talent agency. In August, Ted Ashley became a chief of the film company. On December 16, Warner Bros.-Seven Arts Inc. was rebranded as Warner Bros. Inc. Beginning with the unexpected success of the concert documentary Woodstock (1970), Warner Bros. started scoring box office hits again and became a major studio, and created the original Warner Cable Pictures , which was renamed Dimension Pictures in 1971 . 
 In 1970, Kinney National bought Jac Holzman's Elektra Records and Nonesuch Records.

On June 10, 1971, Kinney sold Riverside Memorial Chapel to Service Corporation International. Kinney also announced that it would form a new separate company focused on its parking and cleaning businesses; National Kinney Corporation was formally founded in September 1971.

On November 22, 1971, Kinney Services also bought Television Communications Corporation (which renamed as Warner Cable in 1973), including its recording studio operations of 1,210,500 common shares.

Kinney National also owned wood flooring manufacturer Circle Floor from Seymour Milstein and Paul Milstein, when Kinney's predecessor bought it in 1964 for $15 million, with the Milsteins remaining as managers of the unit until 1971 before sale.

Financial scandal 
Due to a financial scandal involving price fixing in its parking operations, Kinney National spun off its non-entertainment assets in September 1971 as the National Kinney Corporation, and renamed the remaining Kinney National Company as Warner Communications Inc. on February 10, 1972.

Steve Ross was the company's sole CEO, president, and chairman. Directors included Charles A. Agemian, the CEO of Garden State National Bank.

References 

Predecessors of Warner Bros. Discovery
Conglomerate companies of the United States
Defunct mass media companies of the United States
American companies established in 1966
Mass media companies established in 1966
Mass media companies disestablished in 1972
Corporate scandals
Corporate crime
Conglomerate companies established in 1966
Conglomerate companies disestablished in 1972